Neomordellistena houtiensis is a beetle in the genus Neomordellistena of the family Mordellidae. It was described in 1967 by Franciscolo.

References

houtiensis
Beetles described in 1967